Esther Deden (born 1 July 1994) is a Dutch recurve archer.

Deden represented the Netherlands at the 2015 European Games in the individual event and team event in Baku, Azerbaijan. She also competed in the individual recurve event, team recurve event and mixed team recurve event at the 2015 World Archery Championships in Copenhagen, Denmark.

References

1994 births
Living people
Dutch female archers
Archers at the 2015 European Games
European Games competitors for the Netherlands
Place of birth missing (living people)
Sportspeople from Arnhem
21st-century Dutch women